Student Council (foaled in May 2002) is a millionaire American Thoroughbred racehorse and successful stallion, he is the son of Kingmambo sire of over 80 stakes winners. Bred in Kentucky by William S. Farish III and raced under the Millennium Farms banner for his owner, Ro Parra. He finished racing with a record of 8-4-4 in 31 starts with career earnings of $1,567,731. Student Council was best known for his wins in the grade one Pimlico Special and the grade one Pacific Classic Stakes.

Early career

Student Council was a horse that many owners or trainers may have given up on, he did not win any races as at age two, three or even most of his four-year-old season. In fact in his two-year-old season he raced three times. Not only did he not win but he did not even finish in-the-money in any of those three races. His record as a two-year-old was (3): 0-0-0 with annual earnings of $2,758 in 2004. That earnings figure would not even cover his feed bill for the year. The next year was even worse, he injured himself and only raced once as a three-year-old and the results were no different. Student Council did not even hit the board. His record as a three-year-old was (1): 0-0-0 with annual earnings of only $2,500 in 2005.

As a four-year-old Student Council began to improve and learn from his defeats. He ran in a race in ten straight months from February through November. As the summer ended Student Council began to pick up pieces of the purse finishing third twice and then second. He finally broke his maiden and won his first race after 26 months and ten attempts. His maiden win came at Churchill Downs' Autumn Meet at eight and a half furlongs. He followed that score with another win at Keeneland again at eight and a half furlongs in an allowance race in 1:44.10. In his final race of the year he reeled off another allowance win in November at Turfway Park at an even mile in 1:37.62 on the all-whether track. He finished a successful year with three wins in his last four starts and a record of (10): 3-1-2 with annual earnings of $105,718.

Five-year-old season

At age five, Student Council began to fill out and started taking on graded stakes company. In that company he not only fared well but he won prize money in some very impressive stakes races. He started the year with a second-place finish in the $150,000 grade three Razorback Handicap at Oaklawn Park. He lost that race to Magna Graduate on the first Saturday in March. Student Council raced again in March and won the $100,000 Maxxam Gold Cup Handicap at Sam Houston Park at nine furlongs by 3-1/4 lengths. On the first Saturday in May, Student Council placed third in the $115,000 grade three Alysheba Stakes at Churchill Downs on the Derby undercard. He lost that race to up and coming Wanderin Boy.

In the summer of 2007, Student Council won two of the best races of his career. As a 23-1 longshot, he stunned the field of 12 in the $1,100,000 grade one Pacific Classic Stakes at Del Mar. Under jockey Richard Migliore he beat runners-up Awesome Gem and Hello Sunday as well as favorite Lava Man that August day at a mile and a quarter in 2:07.29. In September, he won his second straight graded race by winning the $500,000 grade two Hawthorne Gold Cup Handicap outside Chicago's Hawthorne Race Course. He beat Jonesboro and A. P. Arrow at ten furlongs in 2:05.00. The victory puts Student Council in the Breeders' Cup Classic through the 'Win and You're In' program. He finished the year as a millionaire with a record of (9): 4-2-1 and annual earnings of $1,041,755.

Six-year-old season

In his six-year-old season in 2008, Student Council fell back to his losing ways, failing to place in four straight races. His owner Ro Parra said Student Council struggled to recover from an eighth-place finish in the Japan Cup Dirt on November 24 at Nakayama racecourse. He finished fifth in the grade two San Antonio Handicap and sixth in the grade one Santa Anita Handicap both at Santa Anita Park. He came into the "Special" off a seventh-place finish in the grade three John B. Connally Turf Handicap at Sam Houston Race Park on April 5.

He was moved from the barn of Vladimir Cerin and moved to Eclipse Award winning trainer Steve Asmussen. Student Council fought back like a Rocky story and won perhaps the most memorable race of his career in the $500,000 grade one Pimlico Special on the day before the Preakness Stakes. Dismissed at odds of 7.50-to-1, he was only one of two grade one winners in the field of seven. The victory was especially significant for owner Ro Parra because he grew up in Lexington Park, Maryland, and attended, by his estimate, at least 15 editions of the Preakness.

Ridden for the first time by jockey Shaun Bridgmohan, Student Council rated in last as they passed the stands for the first time. Gotta Gold and Exchanger led the race and  set a moderate early pace with fractions of :23.8, :47.4, and 1:11.3 in the first 3/4 of a mile. On the far turn Grasshopper, Sir Whimsey and Student Council rushed at the leaders. Gotta Gold was still leading at the top of the stretch clocking one mile at a time of 1:36. Down the lane, Student Council gradually reeled in Gottcha Gold, beating him by a neck at the wire in 1:54.8 on a muddy track. The top two cleared third-place finisher Sir Whimsey by 5-3/4 lengths. Mineshaft Handicap winner Grasshopper finished fifth as the 2-to-1 favorite.

Later that year in July, he finished second in the $750,000 grade one Whitney Handicap at Saratoga Race Course to Commentator. In August he finished third in the $750,000 grade one Hollywood Gold Cup to Mast Track and Go Between. He record as a six-year-old was (7): 1-1-1 with annual earnings of $415,000.

Retirement

Student Council was retired following the Breeders' Cup World Championships in November, 2008. He entered stud duty in 2009 at Millennium Farms in Kentucky.   In November 2015 he was sold to stand Saudi Arabia in a deal brokered by Schumer Bloodstock. [3}

References

3.  https://paulickreport.com/news/bloodstock/g1-winner-student-council-to-stud-in-saudi-arabia/

2002 racehorse births
Thoroughbred family 9-e
Racehorses bred in Kentucky
Racehorses trained in the United States
American Grade 1 Stakes winners